E. Paul Chet Greene (born 15 January 1964) is a Member of the Antigua and Barbuda House of Representatives, and a Cabinet Minister.

Early life 
Chet was born and raised in Liberta, He was educated at the Liberta Primary School and the All Saints Secondary School.

Political career 
Greene successfully won the St. Paul constituency in the 2014 general elections defeating Elson Adams. Six days later, he was appointed Minister of Trade, Commerce and Industries, Sports, Culture, Community Services.

He won his seat again in the 2018 election and was appointed Minister of Foreign Affairs, International Trade, and Immigration on 22 March 2018, by Prime Minister Gaston Browne, one day after the 2018 parliamentary elections.

References 

1964 births
Living people
Members of the House of Representatives (Antigua and Barbuda)
Government ministers of Antigua and Barbuda
Antigua and Barbuda Labour Party politicians